The 2022–23 Eastern Washington Eagles men's basketball team represented Eastern Washington University in the 
Big Sky Conference during the 2022–23 NCAA Division I men's basketball season. Led by second-year head coach David Riley, the Eagles played their home games on campus at Reese Court in Cheney, Washington.

EWU finished the regular season at 21–10 (16–2 in Big Sky, first) to win the regular season championship. After clinching that title at 16–0 with two games remaining, they dropped three straight, including their opener of the conference tournament to ninth seed Northern Arizona in the quarterfinals. As a regular season champion who did not win their conference tournament, Eastern received an automatic bid to the National Invitation Tournament. The Eagles defeated Washington State in the first round before falling to Oklahoma State in the second round.

Previous season
The Eagles finished the 2021–22 season at 18–16 (11–9 in Big Sky, sixth). In the conference tournament, they defeated Northern Arizona in the first round, then fell to third seed Northern Colorado in the quarterfinals. EWU was invited to The Basketball Classic, where they were defeated by Fresno State in the first round.

Roster

Schedule and results

|-
!colspan=12 style=""| Non-conference regular season

|-
!colspan=12 style=""| Big Sky regular season

|-
!colspan=12 style=| 

|-
!colspan=9 style=| NIT

Sources

References

Eastern Washington Eagles men's basketball seasons
Eastern Washington Eagles
Eastern Washington Eagles men's basketball
Eastern Washington Eagles men's basketball
Eastern Washington